SMS V26  was a  of the Imperial German Navy that served during the First World War. The ship was built by AG Vulcan at Stettin in Prussia (now Szczecin in Poland), and was completed in June 1914.

The ship served in the Baltic, North Sea and English Channel, taking part in the Battle of Jutland on 31 May–1 June 1916 and the Battle of Dover Strait on 26/27 October that year. She survived the war after which she was surrendered under the Treaty of Versailles and scrapped in 1922.

Construction and design
In 1913, the Imperial German Navy placed orders for 12 high-seas torpedo boats, with six each ordered from AG Vulcan (V25–V30) and Schichau-Werke (S31–S36). While the designs built by each shipyard were broadly similar, they differed from each other in detail, and were significantly larger and more capable than the small torpedo boats built for the German Navy in the last two years.

V26 was laid down as yard number 347 at AG Vulcan's Stettin shipyard, was launched on 21 February 1914 and commissioned on 1 August 1914.

Armament consisted of three 8.8 cm SK L/45 naval guns in single mounts, together with six 50 cm (19.7 in) torpedo tubes with two fixed single tubes forward and 2 twin mounts aft. Up to 24 mines could be carried. The ship had a complement of 83 officers and men.

Service
On 1 August 1914, Germany declared war on the Russian Empire, with the newly commissioned V26 was deployed to the Baltic coast-defence division as one of the few modern German torpedo boats in the Baltic. The torpedo boats turned back and returned to Memel on 11 August owing to fuel shortages. V26, V25 and V186 together with Augsburg and Magdeburg took part in another sortie into the Baltic from 15 to 20 August, escorting the minelayer  on a mission to lay a minefield at the entrance to the Gulf of Finland. The Russian ships did not attack because they thought that the German force was accompanied by two armoured cruisers. On 26 August, V26 was escorting Magdeburg on a sortie against Russian patrols in the Gulf of Finland when the cruiser ran aground off Osmussaar, Estonia. Attempts by V26 to pull Magdeburg clear failed, and V26 took off part of Magdeburgs crew before the arrival of the Russian cruisers  and  arrived, driving off V26. Unknown to the Germans, the Russians managed to salvage important German code books from Magdeburg, copies of which were passed to the British for use by Room 40.

In September 1914, V26 and V186 were detached to the North Sea, replaced by six torpedo boats (G132–G136) in the Baltic. In October 1914, V26 was part of the 17th Half Flotilla of the 9th Torpedo Boat Flotilla. As a response to an unsuccessful attack on 18 October by the British submarine  on the German cruiser  at the entrance to the Baltic, the newly formed 17th Half-Flotilla, including V26, was diverted from its work-up activities to carry out anti-submarine patrols in the Fehmarn Belt. On 19 October, the 17th Half Flotilla was relieved by the 8th Torpedo Boat Flotilla, and returned to Kiel.

On 15 December 1914 the German battlecruiser squadron under the command of Franz von Hipper set out on an attack on the British east coast towns of Scarborough, Hartlepool, West Hartlepool and Whitby, with the intent of drawing out parts of the British Grand Fleet where it could be defeated in detail. The 9th Torpedo Boat Flotilla, including V26 was part of the escort for Hipper's heavy ships. The weather was extremely poor, with the torpedo-boats struggling in the heavy seas, and after V26 collided with V25 causing minor damage, the torpedo boats turned back, leaving the two cruisers to carry on unescorted. The minefield claimed a British trawler, Windsor, on 22 January.

On 10 February 1916, V26 took part in a sortie by 25 torpedo boats of the 2nd, 6th and 9th Torpedo-boat Flotillas into the North Sea. The sortie led to an encounter between several German torpedo boats and British minesweepers off the Dogger Bank, which resulted in the British minesweeper  being torpedoed and sunk by ships of the 2nd Flotilla. On 24 April 1916, the German battlecruisers of I Scouting Group and the light cruisers of the II Scouting Group set out from Kiel on a mission to bombard the British East-coast towns of Yarmouth and Lowestoft, with the torpedo boats of the 6th and 9th Torpedo Boat Flotillas as escorts, and V26 as part of the 9th Flotilla. The battleships of the High Seas Fleet were deployed in support, with the hope of destroying isolated elements of the British Forces if they tried to intercept. There was a brief engagement between the German forces and the light cruisers and destroyers of the Harwich Force, which caused the German battlecruisers to break off the bombardment of Lowestoft, but rather than take the chance to destroy the outnumbered British force, the Germans chose to retire.

V26 participated in the Battle of Jutland as part of the 17th Half Flotilla of the 9th Flotilla, in support of the German battlecruisers. The 9th Flotilla, including V26, took part in an attempted torpedo attack on British battlecruisers from about 17:26 CET (16:26 GMT). V26 managed to launch a single torpedo at the British battlecruisers (which missed, like all the German torpedoes launched during this attack), but the attack was disrupted by British destroyers of the 13th and the 10th Destroyer Flotillas, which were attempting an attack on the German battlecruisers. The German torpedo boat  was disabled by a shell in her engine room during this engagement, while  was hit by a torpedo from the British destroyer . V26 collected the crew of V27, before attempting to scuttle the stricken torpedo boat. An attempt to torpedo V27 failed when the torpedo would not run straight, and V26 was forced to sink V27 by gunfire. From about 20:15 CET (19:15 GMT), V26 took part in a large-scale torpedo attack on the British fleet in order to cover the outnumber German battleship's turn to west. V26 launched three torpedoes, which as with all the torpedoes launched in this attack, missed. While V26 was unharmed in this attack, several torpedo boats were damaged by heavy British fire, and S35 was sunk. V26 was part of the 9th Torpedo Boat Flotilla during the inconclusive Action of 19 August 1916, when the German High Seas Fleet sailed to cover a sortie of the battlecruisers of the 1st Scouting Group.

In October 1916, the 3rd and 9th Torpedo Boat Flotillas were ordered to reinforce the German naval forces based in Flanders, in order to disrupt the Dover Barrage, a series of anti submarine minefields and nets that attempted to stop U-boats from operating in the English Channel, and to directly attack cross-Channel shipping. The twenty torpedo boats of the two flotillas, including V26, now part of the 18th Half Flotilla of the 9th Flotilla, left Wilhelmshaven on 23 October, reaching Belgium the next day. The 9th Flotilla took part in a large scale raid into the English Channel on the night of 26/27 October 1916, and was assigned the role of attacking Allied shipping while other torpedo boats went after the Dover Barrage, with the 18th Half Flotilla, including V26, to operate off Calais. The 18th Half Flotilla successfully passed through the British defences of the Dover Straits, despite twice encountering British warships on the journey through the barrage. Four British destroyers on passage to Dunkirk were spotted, but failed to see the German ships, while the old destroyer  spotted the 18th Half Flotilla and challenged them, but the Germans repeated Flirts signal and continued on course, with Flirt mistaking the ships for the Laforey division and not engaging or reporting the ships. The 18th Half Flotilla did not encounter any of the hoped for merchant ships, but on its return journey clashed with three British destroyers which attempted to pursue, but lost contact after German fire caused Mohawks rudder to jam.  Other German units sank several drifters that were part of the Dover Barrage together with Flirt (which was attempting to rescue the crews of the drifters) and the merchant ship , and badly damaged the destroyer . The 9th Flotilla continued to operate from Flanders, attacking shipping off the coast of the Netherlands on 1 November. On the night of 23/24 November, V26 was one of 13 torpedo boats that took part in an attempt to attack shipping in the Downs. While they clashed briefly with patrolling drifters, they found none of the shipping anchored on the Downs. On the night of 26/27 November, the 9th Flotilla sortied again, stopping the Dutch merchant ship Beijerland and taking her pilot prisoner, and sinking the naval trawler . The torpedo boats  and  collided during this sortie, badly damaging both ships. The 9th Flotilla (less the two damaged torpedo boats) returned to Germany on 30 November.

V26 collided with the German submarine  at Kiel on 19 March 1917, sinking UB-25 and killing 16 of the submarine's crew. UB-25 was subsequently salvaged and returned to service as a training submarine. By late April 1917, the torpedo boats of the 9th Torpedo Boat Flotilla had been fitted for minesweeping and their crews trained in that task, and became increasingly dedicated to minesweeping. V26 remained part of the 9th Torpedo Boat Flotilla in November 1918, when the Armistice of 11 November 1918 stopped the fighting between Germany and the Allies.

Post-war operations and disposal
By the terms of the Armistice, a large proportion of the Imperial German Navy, including 50 modern torpedo boats, was interned at Scapa Flow in the Orkneys. V26 remained in German hands, however, forming part of the Eisernen Flottille, a volunteer force of torpedo boats remaining in active service and used for security duties, although the ship's torpedo tubes were removed under the terms of the Armistice.  On 21 June 1919, the German fleet interned at Scapa scuttled itself, and as a result, Germany was forced to hand over more warships and equipment, including V26 to the Allies under the Treaty of Versailles to compensate for the ships scuttled at Scapa. The Allies decided to transfer 10 destroyers from the ships surrendered from the German and Austro-Hungarian to each of the French and Italian navies to replace wartime losses. Twenty of the best of the surrendered German torpedo boats, including V26, were therefore sent to Cherbourg in France to allow France and Italy to make their selection. The unwanted ships would be scrapped by Britain. V26 was not wanted, and was sold for scrap on 21 October 1920, and was scrapped at Portishead in 1922.

Notes

References

Bibliography

 

 

 
 

 

Torpedo boats of the Imperial German Navy
1914 ships
Ships built in Stettin
World War I torpedo boats of Germany